Grosuplje is a town in central Slovenia, in the northwest of the traditional region of Lower Carniola. It is the seat of the Municipality of Grosuplje and is a part of the Central Slovenia Statistical Region, having close ties to the nearby capital od Ljubljana.

Name
Grosuplje was first attested in written sources in 1136 as Groslupp (and as Grasslupp in 1220–50, and Grazlup in 1249). The settlement is known as Grasuple in the local dialect. The etymological origin of the name is unclear. One theory derives it from *Graslupoje (selo/poľe)—literally, 'wet (village/field)', from the adjective *graslupъ. Another theory derives the name from Lombard *grass(ah)lauffja 'rapids' but is undermined by the lack of fast-flowing water in the area. Yet another theory derives it from the hypothetical Lombard name *Graslupus borrowed into Slavic as *Groslupъ, whereby *Groslupľe selo would literally mean 'Groslupъ's village'. In the past the German name was Großlupp.

Mass grave
Grosuplje is the site of a mass grave associated with the Second World War. The Koščak Hill Mass Grave is located in the northern part of the town, on Koščak Hill—also known as Brinje Hill. It contains the remains of 15 anticommunist militia members, mostly from the Dobrepolje karst polje, that were held as prisoners of war and murdered between 26 and 28 October 1943.

Church
The parish church in the settlement is dedicated to Saint Michael and belongs to the Roman Catholic Archdiocese of Ljubljana. It was built in 1980 at a site close to an older building dedicated to the same saint.

Notable people 
Notable people that were born or lived in Grosuplje include:
Louis Adamic (1898–1951), Slovenian-American writer
Ana Gale (1909–1944), poet
Jože Gale (1913–2005), film director
Janez Janša (born 1958), former Prime Minister of Slovenia
Stane Valentinčič (1913–1995), veterinarian
Aleksander Čeferin (born 1967), current president of UEFA

References

External links

Grosuplje on Geopedia

Grosuplje municipal site
Grosuplje on Web - Drevored.si

Populated places in the Municipality of Grosuplje
Cities and towns in Lower Carniola